Candy Cigarette may refer to:

Candy cigarette, a type of candy
The third album by the band Boy in Static
Iconic photo by Sally Mann